In Greek mythology, Eurytus (Ancient Greek: Εὔρυτος) and Cteatus (Κτέατος) were twin brothers and also named the Moliones or Molionidai for their mother, Molione.

Family 
Eurytus and Cteatus were the sons of either Actor or Poseidon and nephew of Augeas. Eurytus and Cteatus married the twin daughters of Dexamenus, Theraephone and Theronice, respectively. Their respective sons, Thalpius and Amphimachus, were counted among the Achaean leaders in the Trojan War.

Greek rhetorician and grammar Athenaeus of Naucratis, in his work Deipnosophistae, Book II, cited that poet Ibycus, in his Melodies, described twins Eurytus and Cteatus as "λευκίππους κόρους" ("white-horsed youths") and said they were born from a silver egg, - a story that recalls the myth of Greek divine twins Castor and Pollux and their mother Leda.

Mythology 
Greek legend maintains that the brothers were born conjoined with only one body but two heads, four arms and four legs, though Homer makes no mention of this.

Both brothers went on expeditions of war to the Neleus and the Pylians, and later led an army marching against their uncle Augeas at the behest of Heracles. However after the latter made peace, the brothers attacked Heracles and were subsequently killed by him outside Cleonae.

See also 
  for Jovian asteroid 7641 Cteatus

Notes

References 

 Apollodorus, The Library with an English Translation by Sir James George Frazer, F.B.A., F.R.S. in 2 Volumes, Cambridge, MA, Harvard University Press; London, William Heinemann Ltd. 1921. ISBN 0-674-99135-4. Online version at the Perseus Digital Library. Greek text available from the same website.
 Athenaeus of Naucratis, The Deipnosophists or Banquet of the Learned. London. Henry G. Bohn, York Street, Covent Garden. 1854. Online version at the Perseus Digital Library.
 Athenaeus of Naucratis, Deipnosophistae. Kaibel. In Aedibus B.G. Teubneri. Lipsiae. 1887. Greek text available at the Perseus Digital Library.
 Homer, The Iliad with an English Translation by A.T. Murray, Ph.D. in two volumes. Cambridge, MA., Harvard University Press; London, William Heinemann, Ltd. 1924. . Online version at the Perseus Digital Library.
 Hesiod, Catalogue of Women from Homeric Hymns, Epic Cycle, Homerica translated by Evelyn-White, H G. Loeb Classical Library Volume 57. London: William Heinemann, 1914. Online version at theio.com
 Homer, Homeri Opera in five volumes. Oxford, Oxford University Press. 1920. . Greek text available at the Perseus Digital Library.
 Pausanias, Description of Greece with an English Translation by W.H.S. Jones, Litt.D., and H.A. Ormerod, M.A., in 4 Volumes. Cambridge, MA, Harvard University Press; London, William Heinemann Ltd. 1918. . Online version at the Perseus Digital Library
 Pausanias, Graeciae Descriptio. 3 vols. Leipzig, Teubner. 1903.  Greek text available at the Perseus Digital Library.

Children of Poseidon
Greek mythological heroes
Family of Calyce
Elean characters in Greek mythology